Kimberley Arthur Wells (born 6 August 1958) is an Australian politician. He has been a Liberal member of the Victorian Legislative Assembly since 1992, representing first Wantirna and then Scoresby and Rowville. Wells was the Treasurer of Victoria from December 2010 until March 2013.
Wells was born in Leongatha, Victoria, and attended public schools in Bairnsdale, graduating in 1976.

Career 

Wells received a Bachelor of Business, specialising in accounting, post-graduate Diploma of Business and a Master of Accounting from the Victoria University. He worked as an accountant from 1977, and joined the Liberal Party in 1984, holding various positions in the Wattle Park Branch.

Wells was selected as the Liberal candidate for Wantirna before the 1992 Victorian state election, and was elected. He held the seat until 2002, when it was replaced with safe Liberal Party seat of Scoresby, which Wells held. In 2000 he was appointed Shadow Minister for Corrections, Police and Emergency Services.  He was the Shadow Treasurer from December 2006 to December 2010 and Treasurer of Victoria in the Baillieu Coalition Government from December 2010 to March 2013, when on Premier Ted Baillieu’s resignation, Wells became Minister for Police and Emergency Services and Minister for Bushfire Response in the Napthine Coalition Government. 

Wells’ division of Scoresby was abolished and effectively replaced by the new Division of Rowville for the 2014 Victorian Election, but remained a safe Liberal seat. Wells retained the seat at both the 2014 Victorian State Election and the 2018 Victorian state election.

In September 2021, Wells was dropped from the Shadow Ministry on the return of Matthew Guy to the Liberal Party leadership.

References

External links
 Parliamentary voting record of Kim Wells at Victorian Parliament Tracker

1958 births
Living people
Liberal Party of Australia members of the Parliament of Victoria
Members of the Victorian Legislative Assembly
Victoria University, Melbourne alumni
Treasurers of Victoria
People from Leongatha
21st-century Australian politicians
Victoria (Australia) politicians